In demographics, the rank mobility index (RMI) is a measure of a city's change in population rank among a group of cities.

Formally

where

 R1 = city's rank at time 1
 R2 = city's rank at time 2

A RMI value must be between −1 and 1. A RMI of 0 indicates no change.

Index numbers